Youth Times, also known as Qingnian Shibao,  is a simplified Chinese urban youth newspaper published in the People's Republic of China. The publication is the organ newspaper of the Zhejiang Provincial Committee of the Communist Youth League of China.  

Youth Times focused on Hangzhou, covered Zhejiang, and was issued to the whole China. The newspaper ceased to publish in December of 2020.

History
The founding of the Youth Times can be traced back to when the Rural Youth (农村青年) was launched in 1951 
in Hangzhou by Chen Jinhai (陈金海). 

Rural Youth was renamed as Zhejiang Youth (浙江青年), Zhejiang Youth Post (浙江青年报) and Oriental Youth (东方青年), and was discontinued twice.  

In 1991, the newspaper was relaunched as Zhejiang Youth Post, and officially renamed as Youth Times on October 8, 2001.

At the end of December 2020, Youth Times announced the suspension of publication, and its official website,  qnsb.com, is no longer accessible.

References

Defunct daily newspapers
Defunct newspapers published in China
Mass media in Zhejiang
Publications established in 2001
Daily newspapers published in China
Chinese-language newspapers (Simplified Chinese)